John Addison (c. 1765 – 30 January 1844) was a British composer and double-bass player.

Addison was born, lived, and died in London. He wrote six operettas which were very popular at the time, including, Sacred Drama, Elijah and Songs and Glees. He also authored a book on singing instruction, Singing Practically Treated in a Series of Instructions (1836). Addison's song, "The Woodland Maid" was included among sixteen entries in William Alexander Barrett's fifth volume of Standard English Songs.

References

External links
 

1760s births
1844 deaths
Year of birth uncertain
English classical composers
Glee composers
English double-bassists
Male double-bassists
English male classical composers